Alton is a town in northwest Kane County, Utah, United States. The population was 119 at the 2010 census, a decrease from the 2000 figure of 134.

History
Alton was first settled by Lorenzo Wesley Roundy in 1865 and was originally called "Roundys Station". Roundy's family was forced to leave due to conflicts with the local indigenous tribes. The community was later called "Graham", after Graham Duncan McDonald, a local pioneer. Over the years, many names have been discussed, but a consensus could not be reached. In 1912, a drawing was held at a community event to determine the community's name. Charles R. Pugh, who had been reading about the Alton Fjord in Norway, suggested the name, and it was pulled from the hat by a two-year-old child.

Demographics

As of the census of 2010, there were 119 people in 39 households in the town. The racial makeup of the town was 89% white, 5% Hispanic or Latino, and 2.5% Native American.

The population was 45 percent male and 55 percent female. The population was 38.7 percent under 18 and 20 percent 65 or over.

Geography
Kanab Creek flows past the east side of the community.

Climate
Alton has a warm-summer continental climate (Köppen Dsb).

See also

 List of cities and towns in Utah

References

External links

Populated places established in 1865
Towns in Kane County, Utah
Towns in Utah